Hokejsko drsalno društvo Bled or simply HDD Bled is an ice hockey club from Bled, Slovenia. It was founded in 2010 and currently competes only with junior selections.

References

External links
Official website 
Hokej.si profile 

Ice hockey clubs established in 2010
Ice hockey teams in Slovenia
Sport in Bled
2010 establishments in Slovenia
Slohokej League teams
Articles containing video clips